Each national team has to submit a squad of 18 players, two of whom must be goalkeepers.

Players in boldface have since been capped at full international level.

Ages are as of the start of the tournament, 6 July 2015.

Group A

Greece
On 19 June 2015, Greece announced 23-man preliminary list. On 6 July 2015, Greece named their final squad.

Head coach: Giannis Goumas

Ukraine
On 21 June 2015, Ukraine announced 23-man preliminary list. On 4 July 2015, Ukraine named their final squad.

Head coach: Oleksandr Holovko

Austria
On 18 June 2015, Austria named their squad.

Head coach: Hermann Stadler

France
On 8 June 2015, France named their squad.

Head coach: Patrick Gonfalone

Group B

Germany
On 18 June 2015, Germany named their squad. On 6 July 2015, final changes to the squad were made due to injuries.

Head coach: Marcus Sorg

Spain
On 22 June 2015, Spain announced 24-man preliminary list. On 4 July 2015, Spain named their final squad.

Head coach: Luis de la Fuente

Netherlands
On 19 June 2015, Netherlands announced 28-man preliminary list. On 1 July 2015, Netherlands named their final squad.

Head coach: Aron Winter

Russia
On 19 June 2015, Russia announced 23-man preliminary list.

Head coach: Dmitri Khomukha

References

2015 UEFA European Under-19 Championship
UEFA European Under-19 Championship squads